The New Rags are an American indie rock band from New York, New York.  The New Rags were founded in 2004.

History
The New Rags released the EP "Take Jennie To Brooklyn" in 2005. The use of the single "Your Room" in an international advertisement led to popularity in Japan. The band released their debut full-length "Gotta Get Out Of Here" in Japan shortly after on the label Art Union and later in the United States.

Their single "Your Room" has been placed in advertisements for Nike and Motorola. Their music has also been featured on the television show Weeds

Members
Current
Thomas Merrigan - Piano, Vocals
Andrew Pierce - Drums

Discography

Full Lengths
Gotta Get Out Of Here (Silent Stereo Records, 2010)

EPs
"Take Jennie To Brooklyn" (Silent Stereo Records, 2005)

References

Indie rock musical groups from New York (state)
Musical groups from New York City